The 2020–21 season was Puskás Akadémia FC's 7th competitive season, 4th consecutive season in the OTP Bank Liga and 9th year in existence as a football club.

Transfers

Summer

In:

Out:

Source:

Winter

In:

Out:

Source:

Nemzeti Bajnokság I

League table

Results summary

Results by round

Matches

UEFA Europa League

Qualifying round

Hungarian Cup

Statistics

Appearances and goals
Last updated on 9 May 2021.

|-
|colspan="14"|Youth players:

|-
|colspan="14"|Out to loan:

|-
|colspan="14"|Players no longer at the club:

|}

Top scorers
Includes all competitive matches. The list is sorted by shirt number when total goals are equal.
Last updated on 9 May 2021

Disciplinary record
Includes all competitive matches. Players with 1 card or more included only.

Last updated on 9 May 2021

Overall
{|class="wikitable"
|-
|Games played || 38 (33 OTP Bank Liga, 1 UEFA Europa League and 4 Hungarian Cup)
|-
|Games won || 21 (18 OTP Bank Liga, 0 UEFA Europa League and 3 Hungarian Cup)
|-
|Games drawn || 4 (4 OTP Bank Liga, 0 UEFA Europa League and 0 Hungarian Cup)
|-
|Games lost || 13 (11 OTP Bank Liga, 1 UEFA Europa League and 1 Hungarian Cup)
|-
|Goals scored || 67
|-
|Goals conceded || 47
|-
|Goal difference || +20
|-
|Yellow cards || 89
|-
|Red cards || 5
|-
|rowspan="1"|Worst discipline ||  Roland Szolnoki (11 , 0 )
|-
|rowspan="1"|Best result || 7–0 (A) v Toponár - Magyar Kupa - 10-10-2020
|-
|rowspan="1"|Worst result || 2–6 (A) v Paks - Nemzeti Bajnokság I - 07-11-2020
|-
|rowspan="1"|Most appearances ||  Tamás Kiss (36 appearances)
|-
|rowspan="3"|Top scorer ||  Antonio Mance (10 goals)
|-
|  Jakub Plšek (10 goals)
|-
|  Josip Knežević (10 goals)
|-
|Points || 67/114 (58.77%)
|-

References

External links
 Official Website
 UEFA
 fixtures and results

Puskás Akadémia FC seasons
Hungarian football clubs 2020–21 season